Kim Hak-bum (born 1 March 1960) is a South Korean football manager.

Club career 
Kim played as defender for Kookmin Bank FC, an amateur club team in South Korea, from 1980 to 1991.

Managing career 
In 1992, he retired and coached the team until 1997. On 31 December 1997, Kookmin Bank FC was dissolved.

Meantime, he worked in the Kookmin Bank for some months. In that period, he recorded best seller in his branch office.

In September 1998, he moved to Seongnam Ilhwa Chunma to work as a coach. He learned many things from Cha Kyung-Bok, the former manager of Seongnam Ilhwa Chunma.

His coaching career in Seongnam Ilhwa Chunma ended in 2004. In 2005, he became the manager of Seongnam Ilhwa Chunma.

Kim was appointed as the manager of Chinese Super League side Henan Construction on 12 November 2010. but was sacked mid-season on 23 May 2011 due to disappointing record.

He signed with Seongnam FC and returned to his former club on 9 September 2014.

Honors

Manager
Seongnam Ilhwa Chunma
K League 1 (1) : 2006
FA Cup (1) : 2014

South Korea U-23
 Asian Games (1) : 2018
 AFC U-23 Championship (1) : 2020

References

External links

1960 births
Living people
Association football defenders
South Korean footballers
Goyang KB Kookmin Bank FC players
South Korean football managers
Seongnam FC managers
Gangwon FC managers
Expatriate football managers in China
K League 1 players
South Korean expatriate football managers
People from Gangneung